Emmanuel Poila (born 16 July 1990) is a Solomon Islands footballer who plays as a defender for Solomon Warriors. He made his debut for the national team on September 7, 2012, in a 2-0 win against Tahiti.

International
Poila was named in the Solomon Islands national squad for the first time for the 2012 OFC Nations Cup but he didn't made the final squad. He made his debut two months later in a match against Tahiti.

International goals
Scores and results list Solomon Islands' goal tally first.

References

Living people
1990 births
Association football defenders
Solomon Islands international footballers
Solomon Islands footballers